The second season of the animated television series My Little Pony: Friendship Is Magic, developed by Lauren Faust, originally aired on The Hub, an American pay television channel partly owned by Hasbro. The series is based on Hasbro's My Little Pony line of toys and animated works and is often referred by collectors to be the fourth generation, or "G4", of the My Little Pony franchise. Season 2 of the series premiered on September 17, 2011 and concluded on April 21, 2012.

The show follows a studious unicorn pony named Twilight Sparkle as her mentor Princess Celestia guides her to learn about friendship in the town of Ponyville. Twilight becomes close friends with five other ponies: Applejack, Rarity, Fluttershy, Rainbow Dash, and Pinkie Pie. Each represents a different face of friendship, and Twilight discovers herself to be a key part of the magical artifacts, the "Elements of Harmony". The ponies share adventures and help out other residents of Ponyville, while working out the troublesome moments in their own friendships.

Concept
Hasbro selected animator Lauren Faust as the creative director and executive producer for the show. Faust sought to challenge the established "girly" nature of the existing My Little Pony line, creating more in-depth characters and adventurous settings, incorporating Hasbro's suggestions for marketing of the toy line. From season 2 onward, E/I ("educational and informational") content was dropped in favor of only TV-Y, designed for ages 2 and up.

Production
Lauren Faust left the show after the conclusion of the first season. She was credited in the second season as Consulting Producer. Her involvement in the second season consisted mainly of story conception and scripts, and the involvement ceased after the second season. Despite leaving, she still has high hopes for the staff members, stating that "the gaps I have left are being filled by the same amazing artists, writers, and directors who brought you Season 1. I'm certain the show will be as entertaining as ever".

Cast

Main
 Tara Strong as Twilight Sparkle (speaking voice)
 Rebecca Shoichet as Twilight Sparkle (singing voice)
 Tabitha St. Germain as Rarity (speaking voice)
 Kazumi Evans as Rarity (singing voice)
 Ashleigh Ball as Applejack and Rainbow Dash
 Andrea Libman as Fluttershy and Pinkie Pie (speaking voice)
 Shannon Chan-Kent as Pinkie Pie (singing voice); Libman occasionally
 Cathy Weseluck as Spike

Recurring

 Nicole Oliver as Princess Celestia and Cheerilee
 Tabitha St. Germain as Princess Luna and Granny Smith
 Peter New as Big McIntosh
 Michelle Creber as Apple Bloom
 Madeleine Peters as Scootaloo
 Claire Corlett as Sweetie Belle (speaking voice)
 Michelle Creber as Sweetie Belle (singing voice)

Minor

 Kelly Metzger as Spitfire
 Chantal Strand as Diamond Tiara
 Shannon Chan-Kent as Silver Spoon
 Brenda Crichlow as Zecora
 Lee Tockar as Snips
 Richard Ian Cox as Snails
 Cathy Weseluck as Mayor Mare
 Brian Drummond as Mr. Cake
 Tabitha St. Germain as Mrs. Cake and Pound Cake
 Andrea Libman as Pumpkin Cake

Guest stars

 John de Lancie as Discord
 William Lawrenson as Pipsqueak
 Tabitha St. Germain as Derpy Hooves
 Trevor Devall as Fancypants and Iron Will
 Sylvia Zaradic as Cherry Jubilee
 Samuel Vincent as Flim
 Scott McNeil as Flam
 Peter New as Doctor Horse
 Chiara Zanni as Daring Do/A.K. Yearling
 Brian Drummond as Ahuizotl
 Richard Newman as Cranky Doodle Donkey
 Brenda Crichlow as Matilda
 Vincent Tong as Garble and Donut Joe
 Michael Donovan as Stallion Tourist
 Mark Oliver as Gustave le Grand
 Jan Rabson as Mulia Mild
 Andrew Francis as Shining Armor
 Britt McKillip as Princess Cadance
 Kathleen Barr as Queen Chrysalis

Episodes

Songs

Reception
Reception for the second season of My Little Pony: Friendship Is Magic has generally been positive. Episodes "The Return of Harmony" and "A Canterlot Wedding" received widely positive reviews. We Got This Covered said the series was "plain awesome", calling it "[The] Lord of the Rings with ponies" and SF Weekly stated the series "never stops kicking at its envelope to see what it can get away with, nor does it ever underestimate the intelligence of its audience."

DVD release

References

2011 American television seasons
2012 American television seasons
2
2011 Canadian television seasons
2012 Canadian television seasons